Sky Text was the digital teletext service operated by British Sky Broadcasting (BSkyB) in the United Kingdom and Ireland. It was available on Freeview Channel 206 and Sky. The text service ceased on 30 October 2013 and skyinteractive.com, skytext.sky.com are no longer available to view.

It was originally launched by Sky Channel in 1985.

Sky Text on Freeview
In December 2004. Sky Text was made available on Freeview exclusively for Sky Channels, 2 years later, On 30 May 2006. Sky Text was launched on Freeview Channel 108. and its on Multiplex C providing News, Sport, Weather, In January 2011, Sky Text moved from Multiplex C to Multiplex D. On 19 September 2012, Sky Text moved from 108 to 206. On 30 October 2013, Sky Text ceased broadcasting on Freeview Channel 206. On 3 December 2013. Sky Text was removed from the EPG on channel 206.

Features
News Page 102
Finance Page 114
Sport Page 200
Sport Letters Page 459
Weather Page 151
Showbiz Page 170
National Lottery results Page 216
Holidays Page 301
Program TV Page 550
Program TV Now and Next Page 554
Lifestyle- Program TV- Program on Cinema Page 600
Now TV  App Page 525

External links
Sky Text at skyinteractive.com
Sky Text Holidays
Sky Text screenshots and information

Teletext
Sky Group